Jin Chao-chun (born on 26 November 1951) is a Golden Bell Award-winning Taiwanese actor who achieved regional fame in East Asia and Southeast Asia for his portrayal of the ancient Chinese official Bao Zheng in the 1993 TV series Justice Bao. By 2012 he has portrayed Bao Zheng in over 700 episodes of television series produced in Taiwan, Hong Kong, Mainland China and Singapore. In 1997, he financed the construction of "Chao-chun Film Studio" in Qingdao, China to film Bao Zheng-related television drama.

Filmography

Films

Television

References

External links 

1951 births
Living people
Taiwanese male television actors
Taiwanese male film actors
Fu Hsing Kang College alumni